Modern flat Earth beliefs are promoted by organizations and individuals advocating that the Earth is flat while denying the Earth's sphericity, contrary to over two millennia of scientific consensus. Flat Earth beliefs are pseudoscience; the hypotheses and assertions are not based on scientific knowledge. Flat Earth advocates are classified by experts in philosophy and physics as science deniers.

Flat Earth groups of the modern era date from the middle of the 20th century; some adherents are serious and some are not. Those who are serious are often motivated by religion or conspiracy theories. Through the use of social media, flat Earth theories have been increasingly espoused and promoted by individuals unaffiliated with larger groups. Many believers make use of social media to spread their views.

19th and early 20th centuries

There is a popular yet false belief that the Earth was generally believed to be flat until a few hundred years ago. Earth's sphericity has been widely accepted in the Western world since at least the Hellenistic period (323 BCE–31 BCE). It was not until the 19th century that the Flat Earth concept had a resurgence.

Modern flat Earth belief originated with the English writer Samuel Rowbotham (1816–1884). Based on conclusions derived from his 1838 Bedford Level experiment, Rowbotham published the 1849 pamphlet titled Zetetic Astronomy, writing under the pseudonym "Parallax". He later expanded this into the book Earth Not a Globe, proposing the Earth is a flat disc centred at the North Pole and bounded along its southern edge by a wall of ice, Antarctica. He also published a leaflet titled The Inconsistency of Modern Astronomy and its Opposition to the Scriptures, which argued that the "Bible, alongside our senses, supported the idea that the Earth was flat and immovable and this essential truth should not be set aside for a system based solely on human conjecture".

Rowbotham and followers like William Carpenter gained attention by successful use of pseudoscience in public debates with leading scientists such as Alfred Russel Wallace. Rowbotham created a Zetetic Society in England and New York, shipping over a thousand copies of Zetetic Astronomy. Wallace repeated the Bedford Level experiment in 1870, correcting for atmospheric refraction and showing a spherical Earth.

In 1877, Hampden produced a book A New Manual of Biblical Cosmography. Rowbotham also produced studies that purported to show that the effects of ships disappearing below the horizon could be explained by the laws of perspective in relation to the human eye. In 1883, he founded Zetetic Societies in England and New York, to which he shipped a thousand copies of Zetetic Astronomy.

After Rowbotham's death, Lady Elizabeth Blount established the Universal Zetetic Society in 1893, whose objective was "the propagation of knowledge related to Natural Cosmogony in confirmation of the Holy Scriptures, based on practical scientific investigation". The society published a magazine, The Earth Not a Globe Review, which sold for twopence and remained active well into the early 20th century. A flat Earth journal, Earth: a Monthly Magazine of Sense and Science, was published between 1901 and 1904, edited by Lady Blount. She held that the Bible was the unquestionable authority on the natural world and argued that one could not be a Christian and believe the Earth is a globe. Well-known members included E. W. Bullinger of the Trinitarian Bible Society, Edward Haughton, senior moderator in natural science in Trinity College Dublin and an archbishop. She repeated Rowbotham's experiments, generating some counter-experiments, but interest declined after the First World War. The movement gave rise to several books that argued for a flat, stationary Earth, including Terra Firma by David Wardlaw Scott.

Other notable flat Earthers from this time period include:
 William Carpenter, a printer originally from Greenwich, was a supporter of Rowbotham. Carpenter published Theoretical Astronomy Examined and Exposed – Proving the Earth not a Globe in eight parts from 1864 under the name Common Sense. He later emigrated to Baltimore, where he published One Hundred Proofs the Earth is Not a Globe in 1885. He wrote: "There are rivers that flow for hundreds of miles towards the level of the sea without falling more than a few feet – notably, the Nile, which, in a thousand miles, falls but a foot. A level expanse of this extent is quite incompatible with the idea of the Earth's convexity. It is, therefore, a reasonable proof that Earth is not a globe", as well as: "If the Earth were a globe, a small model globe would be the very best – because the truest – thing for the navigator to take to sea with him. But such a thing as that is not known: with such a toy as a guide, the mariner would wreck his ship, of a certainty! This is a proof that Earth is not a globe."
 John Jasper, an American slave turned prolific preacher, and friend of Carpenter's, echoed his friend's sentiments in his most famous sermon "The Sun do move", preached over 250 times, always by invitation. In a written account of his sermon, published in The Richmond Whig of March 19, 1878, Jasper says he would frequently cite the verse "I saw four angels standing on the four corners of the earth" and follow up by arguing: "So we are living on a four-cornered earth; then, my friends, will you tell me how in the name of God can an earth with four corners be round!" In the same article he argued: "if the earth is like others say, who hold a different theory, peopled on the other side, those people would be obliged to walk on the ground with their feet upward like flies on the ceiling of a room".
 In Brockport, New York, in 1887, M. C. Flanders argued the case of a flat Earth for three nights against two scientific gentlemen defending sphericity. Five townsmen chosen as judges voted unanimously for a flat Earth at the end. The case was reported in the Brockport Democrat.
 Joseph W. Holden of Maine, a former justice of the peace, gave numerous lectures in New England and lectured on flat-Earth theory at the Columbian Exposition in Chicago. His fame stretched to North Carolina, where the Statesville Semi-weekly Landmark recorded at his death in 1900: "We hold to the doctrine that the Earth is flat ourselves and we regret exceedingly to learn that one of our members is dead."
 In 1898, during his solo circumnavigation of the world, Joshua Slocum encountered a group of flat-Earthers in Durban, South Africa. Three Boers, one of them a clergyman, presented Slocum with a pamphlet in which they set out to prove that the world was flat. Paul Kruger, President of the Transvaal Republic, advanced the same view: "You don't mean round the world, it is impossible! You mean in the world. Impossible!"
 From 1915 to 1942 Wilbur Glenn Voliva, who in 1906 took over the Christian Catholic Church, a Pentecostal sect that established a utopian community in Zion, Illinois, preached flat Earth doctrine. When the airship Italia disappeared on an expedition to the North Pole in 1928, he warned the world's press that it had sailed over the edge of the world. He offered a $5000 award ($98,590 in 2022 terms) for proving that the Earth is not flat, under his own conditions. Teaching a globular Earth was banned in the Zion schools, and the message was transmitted on his WCBD radio station.
 Along with those who followed him, Frank Cherry (died 1963), the founder of the Black Hebrew Israelite religion, taught the existence of a flat Earth "surrounded by three layers of heaven."

International Flat Earth Research Society

In 1956, Samuel Shenton created the International Flat Earth Research Society, better known as the "Flat Earth Society", as a successor to the Universal Zetetic Society, running it as "organising secretary" from his home in Dover, England. Given Shenton's interest in alternative science and technology, the emphasis on religious arguments was less than in the predecessor society. This was just before the Soviet Union launched the first artificial satellite, Sputnik; he responded: "Would sailing round the Isle of Wight prove that it were spherical? It is just the same for those satellites."

His primary aim was to reach children before they were convinced about a spherical Earth. Despite plenty of publicity, the space race eroded Shenton's support in Britain until 1967, when he started to become famous due to the Apollo program. When satellite images showed Earth as a sphere, Shenton remarked: "It's easy to see how a photograph like that could fool the untrained eye". Later asked about similar photographs taken by astronauts, he attributed curvature to the use of wide-angle lens, adding, "It's a deception of the public and it isn't right".

In 1969, Shenton persuaded Ellis Hillman, a Polytechnic of East London lecturer, to become president of the Flat Earth Society; but there is little evidence of any activity on his part until after Shenton's death, when he added most of Shenton's library to the archives of the Science Fiction Foundation he helped to establish.

Shenton died in 1971. Charles K. Johnson, a correspondent from California, inherited part of Shenton's library from Shenton's wife; he incorporated and became president of the International Flat Earth Research Society of America and Covenant People's Church in California. Over the next three decades, under his leadership, the Flat Earth Society grew to a reported 3,500 members.

Johnson spent years examining the studies of flat- and round-Earth theories and proposed evidence of a conspiracy against flat Earth: "The idea of a spinning globe is only a conspiracy of error that Moses, Columbus, and FDR all fought..." His article was published in the magazine Science Digest in 1980. It goes on to state: "If it is a sphere, the surface of a large body of water must be curved. The Johnsons have checked the surfaces of Lake Tahoe and the Salton Sea without detecting any curvature."

Johnson issued many publications and handled all membership applications. The most famous publication was Flat Earth News, a quarterly, four-page tabloid. Johnson paid for these publications through annual member dues costing US$6 to US$10 over the course of his leadership. Johnson cited the Bible for his beliefs, and he saw scientists as pulling a hoax which would replace religion with science.

The Flat Earth Society's most recent planet model is that humanity lives on a disc, with the North Pole at its centre and a  wall of ice, Antarctica, at the outer edge. The resulting map resembles the symbol of the United Nations, which Johnson used as evidence for his position. In this model, the Sun and Moon are each  in diameter.

The Flat Earth Society recruited members by speaking against the US government and all its agencies, particularly NASA. Much of the society's literature in its early days focused on interpreting the Bible to mean that the Earth is flat, although they did try to offer scientific explanations and evidence.

Criticism
Eugenie Scott called the group an example of "extreme Biblical-literalist theology: The earth is flat because the Bible says it is flat, regardless of what science tells us".

According to some flat Earthers, the Flat Earth Society is a government-controlled organization whose true purpose is to make ridiculous claims about flat Earth and therefore discredit the flat Earth movement.

Decline and relaunch
According to Charles K. Johnson, the membership of the group rose to 3,500 under his leadership but began to decline after a fire at his house in 1997 which destroyed all of the records and contacts of the society's members. Johnson's wife, who helped manage the membership database, died shortly thereafter. Johnson himself died on 19 March 2001.

In 2004, Daniel Shenton (not related to Samuel) resurrected the Flat Earth Society, basing it around a web-based discussion forum. He believes that no one has provided proof that the world is not flat.

This eventually led to the official relaunch of the society in October 2009, and the creation of a new website, featuring a public collection of flat Earth literature and a wiki. Moreover, the society began accepting new members for the first time since 2001, with musician Thomas Dolby becoming the first to join the newly reconvened society. , over 500 people have become members.

In 2013, part of this society broke away to form a new web-based group also featuring a forum and wiki.

Per country

Canada
Flat Earth Society of Canada was established on 8 November 1970 by philosopher Leo Ferrari, writer Raymond Fraser and poet Alden Nowlan; and was active until 1984. Its archives are held at the University of New Brunswick.

Calling themselves "planoterrestrialists", their aims were quite different from other flat Earth societies. They claimed a prevailing problem of the new technological age was the willingness of people to accept theories "on blind faith and to reject the evidence of their own senses." The parodic intention of the Society appeared in the writings of Ferrari, as he attributed everything from gender to racial inequality on the globularist and the spherical Earth model. Ferrari even claimed to have nearly fallen off "the Edge" of the Earth at Brimstone Head on Fogo Island.

Ferrari was interviewed as an "expert" in the 1990 flat Earth mockumentary In Search of the Edge by Pancake Productions (a reference to the expression "as flat as a pancake"). In the accompanying study guide, Ferrari is outed as a "globularist", a nonce word for someone who believes the Earth is spherical. The real intent of the film, which was part-funded by the Ontario Arts Council and National Film Board of Canada, was to promote schoolchildren's critical thinking and media literacy by "[attempting] to prove in convincing fashion, something everyone knew to be false."

Relaunch
Multi-media artist Kay Burns re-created the Flat Earth Society of Canada as an art project with her alter ego Iris Taylor as its president. Burns created an installation entitled the Museum of the Flat Earth, which included some artefacts from the 1970 group. It was exhibited in 2016 at the Flat Earth Outpost Café in Shoal Bay, Newfoundland.

Italy
In Italy there are no centralised societies on flat Earth. However, since the 2010s, small groups of conspiracy theorists, who carry out meetings, started to emerge and to spread flat Earth theories. Among these are Calogero Greco, Albino Galuppini and Agostino Favari, who organised in 2018–2019 several meetings in Palermo, Sicily, with an entry price of €20.

Among their claims, some include:
 NASA is similar to Disneyland and that astronauts are actors.
 The April 2019 supermassive black hole photo at the core of the supergiant elliptical galaxy Messier 87 is fake.
 The proof Earth is flat lies in a filled bottle where, if placed horizontally, water never curves.

In addition to these, it is their common belief that the United States has a plan to create in Europe a new America open to everyone, where the only value is consumerism and that George Soros commands a satanic globalist conspiracy. They reject the past existence of dinosaurs, the Darwinian theory of evolution, and the authority of the scientific community, claiming scientists are Freemasons.

Former leader of the Five Star Movement political party Beppe Grillo showed interest in the group, admitting to admiring their free speech spirit and to wanting to participate at the May 2019 conference. In the end, however, Grillo did not appear.

Internet-era resurgence

Sociological explanations for counterfactual beliefs
In the Information Age, the availability of communications technology and social media like YouTube, Facebook and Twitter have made it easy for individuals, famous or not, to spread disinformation and attract others to erroneous ideas. One of the topics that has flourished in this environment is that of the flat Earth.
These sites have made it easier for like-minded theorists to connect with one another and mutually reinforce their beliefs. Social media has had a "levelling effect", in that experts have less sway in the public mind than they used to.

YouTube had faced criticism for allowing the spread of misinformation and conspiracy theories through its platform. In 2019, YouTube stated that it was making changes in its software to reduce the distribution of videos based on conspiracy theories including flat Earth.

In 2018, the documentary Behind the Curve was released, which follows prominent modern flat-Earthers including Mark Sargent and Patricia Steere, as well as astrophysicists and psychologists who attempt to explain the growing fad. Dr. Joe Pierre, a professor of psychiatry at UCLA, blamed the Dunning-Kruger effect, in which people who know very little think of themselves as experts; misunderstandings of simple observation; pseudoscientific practices which fail to separate reliable from unreliable conclusions; and a progressive divergence from reality that starts with a belief that conventional information sources and the government aren't to be trusted.

Modern flat-Earthers generally embrace some form of conspiracy theory out of the necessity of explaining why major institutions such as governments, media outlets, schools, scientists, and airlines all assert that the world is a sphere. They tend to not trust observations they have not made themselves, and often distrust or disagree with each other. Patricia Steere admitted in Behind the Curve that she wouldn't believe an event like the Boston Marathon bombing was real unless she had gotten her own leg blown off. Flat Earth believers in the documentary also professed belief in conspiracy theories about vaccines, genetically modified organisms, chemtrails, 9/11, and transgender people; some said dinosaurs and evolution were also fake, and that heliocentrism is a form of Sun worship.

The scientific experts in Behind the Curve pointed to confirmation bias as a way to maintain a counterfactual belief, by cherry-picking only supporting evidence, and dismissing any disconfirming evidence as part of the purported global conspiracy.

Some flat Earth believers, such as authors Zen Garcia and Edward Hendrie cite the Christian Bible as evidence. Some critics of the flat Earth idea, such as astronomer Danny R. Faulkner, are young Earth creationists and attempt to explain away the Bible's flat Earth language.

On 3 May 2018, Steven Novella analysed the modern belief in a flat Earth, and concluded that, despite what most people think about the subject, the believers are being sincere in their belief that the Earth is flat, and are not "just saying that to wind us up". He stated that:

The British sceptical activist Michael Marshall attended the UK's annual Flat Earth UK Convention on 27–29 April 2018 and noted disagreement on several views of the believers in a flat Earth. To Marshall, one of the most telling moments at the convention was the "Flat Earth Addiction" test that was based on a checklist used to determine whether someone is in a cult, without the convention attendees realising the possibility of themselves being in a cult.

Beliefs
Based on the speakers at the 2018 UK's Flat Earth UK Convention, believers in a flat Earth vary widely in their views. While most agree upon a disc-shaped Earth, some are convinced the Earth is diamond-shaped. Furthermore, while most believers do not believe in outer space and none believe humans have ever travelled there, they vary widely in their views of the universe.

Filmmakers of Behind the Curve attended another flat Earth conference at which a substantial number of people believed the Earth was an infinite plane, potentially with more continents beyond the purported circular ice wall of Antarctica. Some flat Earth believers are so conspiratorial they suspect other flat Earth believers are also somehow part of the global conspiracy and aren't to be trusted. In the documentary, conference attendees were warned against attending by Math Powerland a.k.a. Matt Boylan, who posted videos alleging others were working for the CIA or Warner Brothers.

Members of the Flat Earth Society and other flat-Earthers claim that NASA and other government agencies conspire to fabricate evidence that the Earth is spherical. According to the most widely spread version of current flat-Earth theory, NASA is guarding the Antarctic ice wall that surrounds Earth. Flat-Earthers argue that NASA manipulates and fabricates its satellite images, based on observations that the color of the oceans changes from image to image and that continents seem to be in different places. The publicly perpetuated image is kept up through a large-scale practice of "compartmentalization", according to which only a select number of individuals have knowledge about the truth.

Research on the arguments that flat Earthers wield shows three distinct factions, each one subscribing to its own set of beliefs.
 
The first faction subscribes to a faith-based conflict in which atheists use science to suppress the Christian faith. Their argument is that atheists use pseudo-science – evolution, Big Bang, and the round Earth – to make people believe that God is an abstract idea, not real. Instead, their arguments use the Scripture – word-by-word – to support an argument that enables God to really exist. This faction frames flat-Earth arguments as revelatory.

The second faction believes in an overarching conspiracy for knowledge suppression. Building upon the premise that knowledge is power, the flat Earth conspiracy argues that a shadowy group of "elites" control knowledge to remain in power. In their view, lying about the fundamental nature of the Earth primes the population to believe a host of other conspiracies. This faction frames flat-Earth arguments as liberatory.

The third faction believes that knowledge is personal and experiential. They are skeptical of knowledge that comes from authoritative sources, especially government-sanctioned "experts", especially book knowledge. This faction would like to find out themselves whether the Earth truly is round or flat. Because they distrust book knowledge and mathematical proof, this faction believes that the Earth is flat because their observations and lived experiences make it appear as if we live on a flat surface. This faction frames flat-Earth arguments as experimental.

Social and experimental activities of skeptics and believers
Organisations sceptical of fringe beliefs have occasionally performed tests to demonstrate the local curvature of the Earth. One of these, conducted by members of the Independent Investigations Group, at the Salton Sea on 10 June 2018 was attended also by supporters of a flat Earth, and the encounter between the two groups was recorded by the National Geographic Explorer. This experiment successfully demonstrated the curvature of the Earth via the disappearance over distance of boat-based and shore-based targets.

The 2018 documentary Behind the Curve followed two groups of American flat Earth believers who were attempting to gather first-hand empirical proof for that belief. One group from the YouTube show GlobeBusters used a ring laser gyroscope in an attempt to show the Earth was not rotating. Instead, they detected the actual 15-degree-per-hour rotation of the Earth, a measurement they dismissed as corrupted by the device somehow picking up the rotation of the "firmament". Another group used lasers in an attempt to show a several-mile stretch of water is perfectly flat by measuring the distance between the water level and the laser beam along three vertical posts. They were unable to align the beam as they expected to because the surface of the still water was in fact bent by several feet over the distance measured; the experiment was dismissed as inconclusive.

Behind the Curve illustrated how flat Earth believers rely on poorly-verified claims. Mark Sargent claimed to have watched flightaware.com for a very long time to check if any flights traveled between continents in the Southern Hemisphere, which in his disc model would be much further apart than they are on the globe. He claimed to see no such flights, and took this as evidence for the disc model. Caltech astrophysicist Hannalore Gerling-Dunsmore went to the site and immediately found flights that contradicted Sargent's claims.

The solar eclipse of 21 August 2017 gave rise to numerous YouTube videos purporting to show how the details of the eclipse prove the Earth is flat. In 2017, "the Tunisian and Arab scientific and educational world" had a scandal when a PhD student submitted a thesis "declaring Earth to be flat, unmoving, young (only 13,500 years of age), and the centre of the universe".

In 2018, astronomer Yaël Nazé analyzed the controversy over a Ph.D. dissertation proposed by a student at the University of Sfax in Tunisia, which defended a flat Earth, as well as a geocentric model of the solar system and a young Earth. The dissertation, which had not been approved by the committee overseeing environmental studies theses, had been made public and denounced in 2017 by Hafedh Ateb, a founder of the Tunisian Astronomical Society, on his Facebook page.

In March 2019, social media personality Logan Paul released a satirical documentary film about the flat Earth called FLAT EARTH: To The Edge And Back.

The Flat Earth Society has a Twitter account, @FlatEarthOrg. This account shares information about their group and promotes flat Earth ideologies.

Mike Hughes 

Mike Hughes, a daredevil and flat-Earth conspiracy theorist, used a homebuilt crewed-rocket in an attempt to see for himself if the Earth is flat on 24 March 2018. His rocket made of scrap metal was estimated to cost $20,000, and using a mobile home as a custom launchpad managed to climb  with Hughes inside and ended with a hard landing but with parachutes successfully deploying. The amateur rocketeer was not seriously injured and remained firm in his flat Earth beliefs. He claimed that real evidence will come with "larger rockets". Hughes was killed in an accident on 22 February 2020 while piloting a flight of his steam-powered rocket in a further attempt to prove the Earth was flat. The accident was caused by an early deployment and separation of the return parachute on the vehicle. The rocket impacted after falling from an altitude of several hundred feet. Hughes was killed instantly.

After Hughes' death, his public relations representative Darren Shuster stated that Hughes "didn't believe in flat Earth" and that it was "a PR stunt" to get publicity, while Michael Linn, who worked on the documentary Rocketman: Mad Mike's Mission to Prove the Flat-Earth, said that Hughes' belief appeared genuine.

Social consequences and responses
Behind the Curve filmmakers spoke with several people who said that as a result of their flat Earth beliefs they had lost romantic partners and no longer spoke to many friends and family. One said he was tired of being told he was an idiot. The Facebook group Flat Earth Match is a dating site used by some to find romantic partners who share these beliefs. Experts pointed out that after social ties to people outside the flat Earth community are lost, one consequence of abandoning the flat Earth belief would be loss of all remaining relationships.

Caltech physicist Spiros Michaelakis opined that instead of looking down on flat Earthers, scientists should do a better job of teaching scientific facts. Various scientific and medical experts in the documentary supported improving scientific literacy and avoiding marginalization of flat Earthers. They pointed out that people who distrust all of science, including truths about vaccines, evolution, and climate change, would make poorly informed-decisions, and that people who do not exercise the skill of critical thinking can be easily manipulated. They also pointed out that some believers were motivated to spread false ideas, and that because they are unconstrained by facts they can mutate and become less harmless than a mere belief about the shape of the Earth.

Effects of and empirical evidence for spherical shape

See also

 Figure of the Earth
 Geodesy
 Hollow Earth
 :Category:Flat Earth proponents

Notes and references

Notes

References

 Valenzuela, S. (19 April 2019). History's most famous Flat Earth believers: Athletes, celebrities, and ancient Greeks. Retrieved 3 March 2020

Further reading

Scientific sources
 Raymond Fraser (2007). When The Earth Was Flat: Remembering Leonard Cohen, Alden Nowlan, the Flat Earth Society, the King James monarchy hoax, the Montreal Story Tellers and other curious matters. Black Moss Press, 
 Christine Garwood (2007) Flat Earth: The History of an Infamous Idea, Pan Books,

Flat Earth believers
  Arguments based on Christian Bible and related writings.
  Christian basis.

External links
 The Flat Earth Society (2004/2009)
 The Flat Earth Society (2013)
 The International Flat Earth Research Society
The Modern Day Flat Earth Community
 References to The Flat Earth Society by the Library of Congress
 Article on Daniel Shenton
 3D Interactive Earth Globe

Anti-intellectualism
Conspiracy theories
Denialism

Religious practices
Modern geocentrism
Pseudoastronomy